Ismet Peja (April 27, 1937 – November 23, 2020) was an Albanian folk singer from Kosovo. He has been credited as among the most influential Albanian folk singers.

He was the son of Musa Peja, who was also an Albanian folk singer. He began to play music in his youth, at about 13-14. He became a singer and went on to build a difficult "urban repertoire", which in the years he further expanded, also including commercial songs. He became part of the group "Hajdar Dushi" with which he achieved his greatest successes and had numerous presentations at TVP and Radio Prishtina. His first album was released in 1986 with the "Hajdar Dushi" orchestra. He released a large number of music albums and 4 videotapes. In 2010, Ismet Peja and Burim Mehmeti released "Knoma Kengen Sa T`jam Gjalle". Lyrics and music for the song were written and composed by Besim Bunjaku. In 2012, Ismet Peja and Vellezerit Mziu released the album "Gamle Folkesange".

He died on November 23, 2020. The then Minister of Culture, Youth and Sports Vlora Dumoshi reacted to his death, stating that his name will be "eternally associated with the original Albanian song, with the Albanian folk melody and with the musical activity of Kosovo in general."

References

1937 births
2020 deaths
20th-century Albanian male singers
Albanian pop singers
Albanian folk singers
People from Gjakova
21st-century Albanian male singers